Mary Beth Hurt (née Supinger; born September 25, 1946) is an American actress of stage and screen. She is a three-time Tony Award-nominated actress.

Notable films in which Hurt has appeared include Interiors (1978), The World According to Garp (1982), The Age of Innocence (1993), and Six Degrees of Separation (1993). She has also collaborated with her husband, filmmaker Paul Schrader, in such films as Light Sleeper (1992) and Affliction (1997).

Early life
Hurt was born Mary Beth Supinger in Marshalltown, Iowa, the daughter of Delores Lenore (née Andre) and Forrest Clayton Supinger. Her childhood babysitter was actress Jean Seberg, also a Marshalltown native. Hurt studied drama at the University of Iowa and at New York University's Graduate Acting Program at the Tisch School of the Arts.

Career
Hurt made her New York stage debut in 1974. She was nominated for three Tony Awards for her Broadway performances in Trelawny of the Wells, Crimes of the Heart (for which she won an Obie Award), and Benefactors.

Hurt made her film debut in Woody Allen's dramatic film Interiors (1978) as Joey, the second of three sisters dealing with the emotional fallout of a family's disintegration and their mother's descent into mental illness. Hurt's powerful turn in that film earned her a BAFTA. Other film roles include Laura in Chilly Scenes of Winter (1979); Helen Holm Garp in The World According to Garp (1982); and Regina Beaufort in Martin Scorsese's The Age of Innocence. Hurt also played Jean Seberg, in voiceover, in Mark Rappaport's 1995 documentary From the Journals of Jean Seberg.

Hurt was nominated for the Independent Spirit Award for Best Supporting Female for her performance in 2006 movie The Dead Girl. For her role in Crimes of the Heart (1981) she was nominated for Drama Desk Award and earned an Obie Award. In addition to these honors, Hurt also received a Clarence Derwent Award in 1975 for Best Supporting Female for her role in the Off-Broadway production of the play Love for Love.

Personal life
Hurt was married to actor William Hurt from 1971 to 1982. She married writer/film director Paul Schrader in 1983; the couple have a daughter and a son. She is close friends with fellow actor Glenn Close, who understudied her in the play Love for Love in 1974.

On February 11th, 2023, her husband Paul shared on his Facebook account that Mary Beth had been placed in memory care.

Filmography

Film

Television

Theater

References

External links
 
 
 
 Profile at Internet Theatre Database

Actresses from Iowa
American film actresses
American stage actresses
American television actresses
Living people
Obie Award recipients
People from Marshalltown, Iowa
University of Iowa alumni
20th-century American actresses
21st-century American actresses
Tisch School of the Arts alumni
1946 births